Kaunas Prison is a prison in the center of Kaunas, second largest city of Lithuania. As of 2007, it houses approximately 300 prisoners and employs around 230 prison guards. Most prisoners are there under temporary arrest awaiting court decisions or transfers to other detention facilities.

History
The Kaunas Prison was completed in 1864, just after the January Uprising during the times of the Russian Empire. At the time it was a modern prison in the whole region. It had 300 places for prisoners, a chapel, administrative-household premises, and apartments for employees were planned. But later there the number of places for prisoners grew up to 550. Kaunas Prison was seen far in environs of Kaunas center and aroused terror in everybody. Sometimes it was even called “Kaunas Bastille”. During the period of 1905 Revolution, the prison was overcrowded with political prisoners. The branch of Kaunas Prison was established in the Ninth Fort of Kaunas Fortress in 1924.

During World War II, in June 1941, during the German invasion of the Soviet Union, the majority of the convicts in the Kaunas Prison were of Jewish nationality. Most of them were executed at the Ninth Fort. The greater part of the prisoners kept in Kaunas Prison, was the prisoners under interrogation. Due to the lack of food, medical care, the exhaustive work, beating, the mortality of prisoners was rather high. Kaunas Prison was completely liquidated in 1960. After the reconstruction, in the place of the former Kaunas Prison the scientific research center of Kaunas Polytechnic Institute was settled.

Due to the lack of places for individuals under the temporary arrest awaiting court decisions and transfers to other detention sites, Kaunas Remand Prison was to be reconstructed by the resolution adopted by the Government of Lithuania in 1993. After the major reconstruction, Kaunas Remand Prison was opened in the same place in 2004. Now it is the most modern imprisonment institution in Lithuania.

Notable prisoners

 Michał Elwiro Andriolli, Polish painter and architect
 Leonas Bistras, former Prime Minister of Lithuania
 Felix Dzerzhinsky, Soviet statesman and founder of the Cheka
 Antanas Mackevičius, Lithuanian priest and a leader of the January Uprising
 Vytautas Petrulis, former Prime Minister of Lithuania
 Augustinas Povilaitis, captain of the Lithuanian Army and director of the State Security Department
 Kazys Skučas, Lithuanian politician and general of the Lithuanian Army
 Antanas Sniečkus, Lithuanian communist leader

References

External links
 

1864 establishments in the Russian Empire
Buildings and structures completed in 1864
Buildings and structures in Kaunas
Prisons in Lithuania
Holocaust locations in Lithuania